Don't Say Die is a 1950 British comedy film directed by Vivian Milroy and starring Charles Heslop, Sandra Dorne and Constance Smith. It is also known by the alternative title of Never Say Die.

Cast
 Charles Heslop as Charles Choosey  
 Sandra Dorne as Sandra  
 Desmond Walter-Ellis as The Hon. Bertie Blarney  
 Constance Smith as Red Biddy 
 Tony Quinn as Mike Murphy  
 Stanley Rose as Gus  
 Derek Tansley as Potts  
 Thomas Gallagher as Gorilla  
 Raymond Rollett as Ticket Inspector 
 Michael Raghan as Station Master  
 Kenneth Connor as Pat O'Neill 
 Harry Lane as McClusky  
 Denis McCarthy as O'Toole

References

Bibliography
 David Quinlan. Quinlan's Illustrated Directory of Film Comedy Stars. Batsford, 1992.

External links

1950 films
British comedy films
1950 comedy films
British black-and-white films
1950s English-language films
1950s British films